Server Name Indication (SNI) is an extension to the Transport Layer Security (TLS) computer networking protocol by which a client indicates which hostname it is attempting to connect to at the start of the handshaking process. This allows a server to present one of multiple possible certificates on the same IP address and TCP port number and hence allows multiple secure (HTTPS) websites (or any other service over TLS) to be served by the same IP address without requiring all those sites to use the same certificate. It is the conceptual equivalent to HTTP/1.1 name-based virtual hosting, but for HTTPS. This also allows a proxy to forward client traffic to the right server during TLS/SSL handshake. The desired hostname is not encrypted in the original SNI extension, so an eavesdropper can see which site is being requested.

Background of the problem
Prior to SNI, when making a TLS connection, the client had no way to specify which site it is trying to connect to. Hence, if one server hosts multiple sites on a single listener, the server has no way to know which certificate to use in the TLS protocol. In more detail, when making a TLS connection, the client requests a digital certificate from the web server. Once the server sends the certificate, the client examines it and compares the name it was trying to connect to with the name(s) included in the certificate. If a match occurs, the connection proceeds as normal. If a match is not found, the user may be warned of the discrepancy and the connection may abort as the mismatch may indicate an attempted man-in-the-middle attack. However, some applications allow the user to bypass the warning to proceed with the connection, with the user taking on the responsibility of trusting the certificate and, by extension, the connection.

However, it may be hard – or even impossible due to lack of a full list of all names in advance – to obtain a single certificate that covers all names a server will be responsible for. A server that is responsible for multiple hostnames is likely to need to present a different certificate for each name (or small group of names). It is possible to use subjectAltName to contain multiple domains controlled by one person in a single certificate. Such "unified communications certificates" must be reissued every time the list of domains changes.

Name-based virtual hosting allows multiple DNS hostnames to be hosted by a single server (usually a web server) on the same IP address. To achieve this, the server uses a hostname presented by the client as part of the protocol (for HTTP the name is presented in the host header). However, when using HTTPS, the TLS handshake happens before the server sees any HTTP headers. Therefore, it was not possible for the server to use the information in the HTTP host header to decide which certificate to present and as such only names covered by the same certificate could be served from the same IP address.

In practice, this meant that an HTTPS server could only serve one domain (or small group of domains) per IP address for secured and efficient browsing. Assigning a separate IP address for each site increases the cost of hosting, since requests for IP addresses must be justified to the regional Internet registry and IPv4 addresses are now exhausted. For IPv6, it increases the administrative overhead by having multiple IPs on a single machine, even though the address space is not exhausted. The result was that many websites were effectively constrained from using secure communications.

Technical principles 
SNI addresses this issue by having the client send the name of the virtual domain as part of the TLS negotiation's ClientHello message. This enables the server to select the correct virtual domain early and present the browser with the certificate containing the correct name. Therefore, with clients and servers that implement SNI, a server with a single IP address can serve a group of domain names for which it is impractical to get a common certificate.

SNI was added to the IETF's Internet RFCs in June 2003 through RFC 3546, Transport Layer Security (TLS) Extensions. The latest version of the standard is RFC 6066.

Security implications 

Server Name Indication payload is not encrypted, thus the hostname of the server the client tries to connect to is visible to a passive eavesdropper. This protocol weakness was exploited by security software for network filtering and monitoring and governments to implement censorship. Presently, there are multiple technologies attempting to hide Server Name Indication.

Domain fronting 

Domain fronting is a technique of replacing the desired host name in SNI with another one hosted by the same server or, more frequently, network of servers known as Content Delivery Network. When a client uses domain fronting, it replaces the server domain in SNI (unencrypted), but leaves it in the HTTP host header (which is encrypted by TLS) so that server can serve the right content. Domain fronting violates the standard defining SNI itself, so its compatibility is limited (many services check that SNI host matches the HTTP header host and reject connections with domain-fronted SNI as invalid). While domain fronting was used in the past to avoid government censorship, its popularity dwindled because major cloud providers (Google, Amazon's AWS and CloudFront) explicitly prohibit it in their TOS and have technical restrictions against it.

Encrypted Client Hello 
Encrypted Client Hello (ECH) is a TLS 1.3 protocol extension that enables encryption of the whole Client Hello message, which is sent during the early stage of TLS 1.3 negotiation. ECH encrypts the payload with a public key that the relying party (a web browser) needs to know in advance, which means ECH is most effective with large CDNs known to browser vendors in advance.

The initial 2018 version of this extension was called Encrypted SNI (ESNI) and its implementations were rolled out in an "experimental" fashion to address this risk of domain eavesdropping. Firefox 85 removed support for ESNI. In contrast to ECH, Encrypted SNI encrypted just the SNI rather than the whole Client Hello. Opt-in support for this version was incorporated into Firefox in October 2018 and required enabling DNS-over-HTTPS.

In March 2020, ESNI was reworked into the ECH extension, after analysis demonstrated that encrypting only the SNI is insufficient. For example, specifications permit the Pre-Shared Key extension to contain any data to facilitate session resumption, even transmission of a cleartext copy of exactly the same server name that is encrypted by ESNI. Also, encrypting extensions one-by-one would require an encrypted variant of every extension, each with potential privacy implications, and even that exposes the set of extensions advertised. Lastly, real-world deployment of ESNI has exposed interoperability limitations. The short name was ECHO in March 2020 and changed to ECH in May 2020.

Both ESNI and ECH are compatible only with TLS 1.3 because they rely on KeyShareEntry which was first defined in TLS 1.3. Also, to use ECH, the client must not propose TLS versions below 1.3.

In August 2020, the Great Firewall of China started blocking ESNI traffic, while still allowing ECH traffic.

In October 2020, Russian ISP Rostelecom and its mobile operator Tele2 started blocking ESNI traffic. In September of the same year, Russian censorship ministry Roscomnadzor planned to ban a range of encryption protocols, among which were TLS 1.3 and ESNI, which hindered web site access censorship.

Implementation 
In 2004, a patch for adding TLS/SNI into OpenSSL was created by the EdelKey project. In 2006, this patch was then ported to the development branch of OpenSSL, and in 2007 it was back-ported to OpenSSL 0.9.8 (first released in 0.9.8f).

For an application program to implement SNI, the TLS library it uses must implement it and the application must pass the hostname to the TLS library. Further complicating matters, the TLS library may either be included in the application program or be a component of the underlying operating system. Because of this, some browsers implement SNI when running on any operating system, while others implement it only when running on certain operating systems.

Support

References

External links 
  (obsoletes , which obsoleted )

Internet protocols
Secure communication
Web hosting
Transport Layer Security